Fager er lien (Fair Is the Hillside) is a Norwegian romantic silent film from 1925 directed by Harry Ivarson (his second feature film after his debut with Til sæters in 1924). Ivarson also wrote the screenplay. The film belongs to the national romantic period of the 1920s. The title is a reference to the thirteenth-century Njáls saga.

Before the film was released, six meters of footage showing dancing were edited out. The film is now considered lost.

Plot
Aase lives with her grandfather in a cabin on a hill. Life seems sad and poor to her. The best thing she knows is to sit at dusk and dream. Aase is fond of Kaare, who works on a large estate nearby. The estate owner, Fredrik-August Reventlow, is also interested in Aase and does not give up even though she has rejected his invitations. Fredrik-August arranges a party at the estate, and Aase is asked to serve at the party. She is attacked by the landlord and later gives birth to a child.

Cast
 Aase Bye as Aase Nordhaug
 Oscar Larsen as Aase's grandfather
 Olafr Havrevold as Kaare
 Finn Lange as Kristian, a Salvation Army member
 Didi Holtermann as Hulda Stiansen
 Oscar Magnussen as Oskar
 Frithjof Fearnley	as Fredrik-August Reventlow, an estate owner
 Ruth Brünings-Sandvik as Mademoiselle Wadjewska
 Rebekka Lie as a prostitute
 Britt Eriksen as a little girl
 Erling Knudsen		
 Unni Torkildsen

References

External links

Fager er lien at the National Library of Norway

1925 films
Norwegian silent feature films
Films directed by Harry Ivarson
Norwegian black-and-white films
Norwegian drama films
1925 drama films
Silent drama films